Pablo Albano and Àlex Corretja were the defending champions, but Corretja did not participate this year.  Albano partnered Jonas Björkman, losing in the semifinals.

Todd Woodbridge and Mark Woodforde won the title, defeating Joshua Eagle and Andrew Florent 6–0, 6–3 in the final.

Seeds

  Todd Woodbridge /  Mark Woodforde (champions)
  Joshua Eagle /  Andrew Florent (final)
  Pablo Albano /  Jonas Björkman (semifinals)
  David Adams /  Brett Steven (quarterfinals)

Draw

Draw

External links
Draw

1998 ATP Tour
Doubles